Tara Flood (born 1966) is a retired British Paralympic swimmer who competed in three Paralympic Games and winning seven medals. She was born without her forearms. She is now a disability rights activist.

Personal life
Flood was born in Preston, Lancashire and was discriminated by her grandmother who often insulted her mother by saying "look what Sally's given birth to" which emotionally affected both Tara and her mother. Her mother had a nervous breakdown when Tara was two days old and was heavily sedated.

She attended a residential special school at sixteen months to her sixteenth birthday in East Sussex.

Swimming career
Flood's first experiences of being in the pool was when she was two or three years old, she was thrown into the pool and described "those of us that literally bobbed to the surface were just sort of like, oh great, let's really sort of get on, and those that didn't were just sort of pulled out".

Flood began swimming aged five at her residential school where she took swimming lessons with other children who had similar disabilities to her. She began swimming competitively aged twelve then attended the 1984 Summer Paralympics in New York City aged thirteen.

Disability rights activism
Flood works in London at as a disability activist and worked in various disability rights charities in the city. She was also involved with the UN Convention on the Rights of Persons with Disabilities and is campaigning to get the Convention fully implemented.

References

1966 births
Living people
Sportspeople from Preston, Lancashire
Sportspeople from London
Paralympic swimmers of Great Britain
Swimmers at the 1984 Summer Paralympics
Swimmers at the 1988 Summer Paralympics
Swimmers at the 1992 Summer Paralympics
Medalists at the 1984 Summer Paralympics
Medalists at the 1988 Summer Paralympics
Medalists at the 1992 Summer Paralympics
Paralympic medalists in swimming
Paralympic gold medalists for Great Britain
Paralympic silver medalists for Great Britain
Paralympic bronze medalists for Great Britain
British female freestyle swimmers
S2-classified Paralympic swimmers
20th-century British women